Bankelal is a fictional comic book character, that appears in comic books published by Raj Comics. He is a satirical character presented as a medieval "Hasya Samrat" (King of Comedy). The series is primarily humorous, though also incorporates elements of fantasy and horror.

In 2016, BBC reported Bankelal among the four most widely sold comics in India. Raj Comics declared that Bankelal will be among the four comics characters whose animated movies will be released. In 2014, Navbharat Times listed Bankelal among the top 10 comics without which the summers of Indian children were incomplete.

Origin
Bankelal was created by Jitendra Bedi, and first appeared in 1987 in the comic book 'Bankelal Ka Kamaal' ('Wonders of Bankelal') which was written by Papindar Juneja.

According to the book, he is the son of a farmer named 'Nanku'. His mother's name was 'Gulabati'. The couple did not have any children. Gulabati was a devotee of Lord 'Shiva' and a child was offered to them as a blessing from the Lord. They named  the child  Bankelal. He conspires to do evil against king Vikram Singh, but his conspiracies often end up helping Singh, to humorous effect.

Plot summary
Most of the stories of the series are of only one issue. Most issues start with Bankelal knowing a secret or something which he may use to kill king Vikram Singh and usurp the throne. Story develops further with the involvement of sages, yogis, Devi-Devtas and Rakshas, each of whom comes with incredible humorous twist to the story. In the end all the trickeries of Bankelal fail and Vikram Singh gets a lot of favor rather than harm.

Though there are some issues that are linked to each other like series in which Bankelal and Vikram Singh travel to different lokas (worlds). This series includes issues such as Bankelal Tataiyalok Me, Kankaallok Me, Dev Lok Me, Sarplok Me, Vanarlok Me.

Attributes
One day Lord Shiva visited Bankelal's home with his consort Parvati. His mother offered them a glass of milk unaware that her naughty child had put a frog in the milk ! When Lord Shiva discovered this he put a curse on Bankelal that if ever Bankelal tried to harm anybody, the person would be blessed with good results and some part of that would also be 'rubbed' on to Bankelal.

Powers and abilities
Bankelal seems extremely stupid but he possesses a mind of devil, always planning mischief. But due to the"blessed" curse placed on him, every bad that he wants to do turns out to be good, turning the odds in his favour. Other than that, he has nothing, not even a good face, and only a silly Charlie Chaplin styled moustache and his two bucked teeth coming out when he screams or when he laughs. The good thing is that his every misdeed (mischief) acts as a funny tickle bone for the readers.

Family, friends, and allies
Rani Swarnalata. Wife of maharaj Vikram Singh. Bankelal has a horse named Chetak which is another very funny character in comics series. Some notable guest appearances in Bankelal series includes Tilismdev and Bhokal.

Enemies
Bankelal considers Raja Vikram Singh as his arch enemy. Bankelal always tries to kill him (never managed so far) and become the king of Vishalgarh.
Mohak Singh, the  prince of Vishalgarh is quite aware of his evil plans. Other courtiers are also jealous of Bankelal's popularity. These include Senapati Markhap, Prabandh Mantri and many others. Some nearby princely states of Vishalgarh also find it hard to kill Vikram Singh until Bankelal is with him.

List of comic books

References

External links
Raj Comics

Indian comics
Indian comics characters
Raj Comics characters
Humour and wit characters of India